The Creative Award (or Innovative Award) is one of the categories of the competition for Taiwanese television production, Golden Bell Awards. It has been awarded since 2016.

Winners

2020s

References

Creative Award
Golden Bell Awards, Creative Award